The Tocharian (sometimes Tokharian) languages ( or ), also known as Arśi-Kuči, Agnean-Kuchean or Kuchean-Agnean, are an extinct branch of the Indo-European language family spoken by inhabitants of the Tarim Basin, the Tocharians. The languages are known from manuscripts dating from the 5th to the 8th century AD, which were found in oasis cities on the northern edge of the Tarim Basin (now part of Xinjiang in Northwest China) and the Lop Desert. The discovery of these languages in the early 20th century contradicted the formerly prevalent idea of an east–west division of the Indo-European language family as centum and satem languages, and prompted reinvigorated study of the Indo-European family. Scholars studying these manuscripts in the early 20th century identified their authors with the Tokharoi, a name used in ancient sources for people of Bactria (Tokharistan). Although this identification is now believed to be mistaken, "Tocharian" remains the usual term for these languages.

The discovered manuscripts record two closely related languages, called Tocharian A (also East Tocharian, Agnean or Turfanian) and Tocharian B (West Tocharian or Kuchean). The subject matter of the texts suggests that Tocharian A was more archaic and used as a Buddhist liturgical language, while Tocharian B was more actively spoken in the entire area from Turfan in the east to Tumshuq in the west. A body of loanwords and names found in Prakrit documents from the Lop Nor basin have been dubbed Tocharian C (Kroränian). A claimed find of ten Tocharian C texts written in Kharoṣṭhī script has been discredited.

The oldest extant manuscripts in Tocharian B are now dated to the 5th or even late 4th century AD, making it a language of Late Antiquity contemporary with Gothic, Classical Armenian, and Primitive Irish.

Discovery and significance

The existence of the Tocharian languages and alphabet was not even suspected until archaeological exploration of the Tarim Basin by Aurel Stein in the early 20th century brought to light fragments of manuscripts in an unknown language, dating from the 6th to 8th centuries AD.

It soon became clear that these fragments were actually written in two distinct but related languages belonging to a hitherto unknown branch of Indo-European, now known as Tocharian:
Tocharian A (Agnean or East Tocharian; natively ) of Qarašähär (ancient Agni, Chinese Yanqi) and Turpan (ancient Turfan and Xočo), and
Tocharian B (Kuchean or West Tocharian) of Kucha and Tocharian A sites.

Prakrit documents from 3rd-century Krorän and Niya on the southeast edge of the Tarim Basin contain loanwords and names that appear to come from a closely related language, referred to as Tocharian C.

The discovery of Tocharian upset some theories about the relations of Indo-European languages and revitalized their study. In the 19th century, it was thought that the division between centum and satem languages was a simple west–east division, with centum languages in the west. The theory was undermined in the early 20th century by the discovery of Hittite, a centum language in a relatively eastern location, and Tocharian, which was a centum language despite being the easternmost branch. The result was a new hypothesis, following the wave model of Johannes Schmidt, suggesting that the satem isogloss represents a linguistic innovation in the central part of the Proto-Indo-European home range, and the centum languages along the eastern and the western peripheries did not undergo that change.

Several scholars identify the ancestors of the Tocharians with the Afanasievo culture of South Siberia ( 3300–2500 BC), an early eastern offshoot of the steppe cultures of the Don-Volga area that later became the Yamnayans. Under this scenario, Tocharian-speakers would have immigrated to the Tarim Basin from the north at some later point. On this basis, Michaël Peyrot argues that several of the most striking typological peculiarities of Tocharian are rooted in a prolonged contact of Proto-Tocharian with an early stage of Proto-Samoyedic in South Siberia. Among others, this might explain the merger of all three stop series (e.g. *t, *d, *dʰ > *t), which must have led to a huge number of homonyms, as well as the development of an agglutinative case system.

Most scholars reject Walter Bruno Henning's proposed link to Gutian, a language spoken on the Iranian plateau in the 22nd century BC and known only from personal names.

Tocharian probably died out after 840 when the Uyghurs, expelled from Mongolia by the Kyrgyz, moved into the Tarim Basin. The theory is supported by the discovery of translations of Tocharian texts into Uyghur.

Some modern Chinese words may ultimately derive from a Tocharian or related source, e.g. Old Chinese  "honey", from Proto-Tocharian *ḿət(ə) (where *ḿ is palatalized; cf. Tocharian B ), cognate with Old Church Slavonic  (meaning "honey"), and English .

Names

A colophon to a Buddhist manuscript in Old Turkic from 800 AD states that it was translated from Sanskrit via a twγry language. In 1907 Emil Sieg and Friedrich W. K. Müller guessed that this referred to the newly discovered language of the Turpan area.
Sieg and Müller, reading this name as toxrï, connected it with the ethnonym Tócharoi (Ptolemy VI, 11, 6, 2nd century AD), itself taken from Indo-Iranian (cf. Old Persian tuxāri-, Khotanese ttahvāra, and Sanskrit tukhāra), and proposed the name "Tocharian" (German Tocharisch). Ptolemy's Tócharoi are often associated by modern scholars with the Yuezhi of Chinese historical accounts, who founded the Kushan empire. It is now clear that these people actually spoke Bactrian, an Eastern Iranian language, rather than the language of the Tarim manuscripts, so the term "Tocharian" is considered a misnomer.

Nevertheless, it remains the standard term for the language of the Tarim Basin manuscripts.

In 1938, Walter Bruno Henning found the term "four twγry" used in early 9th-century manuscripts in Sogdian, Middle Iranian, and Uighur. He argued that it referred to the region on the northeast edge of the Tarim, including Agni and Karakhoja, but not Kucha. He thus inferred that the colophon referred to the Agnean language.

Although the term twγry or toxrï appears to be the Old Turkic name for the Tocharians, it is not found in Tocharian texts.
The apparent self-designation ārśi appears in Tocharian A texts. Tocharian B texts use the adjective kuśiññe, derived from kuśi or kuči, a name also known from Chinese and Turkic documents. The historian Bernard Sergent compounded these names to coin an alternative term Arśi-Kuči for the family, recently revised to Agni-Kuči, but this name has not achieved widespread usage.

Writing system

Tocharian is documented in manuscript fragments, mostly from the 8th century (with a few earlier ones) that were written on palm leaves, wooden tablets, and Chinese paper, preserved by the extremely dry climate of the Tarim Basin. Samples of the language have been discovered at sites in Kucha and Karasahr, including many mural inscriptions.

Most of attested Tocharian was written in the Tocharian alphabet, a derivative of the Brahmi alphabetic syllabary (abugida) also referred to as North Turkestan Brahmi or slanting Brahmi. However a smaller amount was written in the Manichaean script in which Manichaean texts were recorded. It soon became apparent that a large proportion of the manuscripts were translations of known Buddhist works in Sanskrit and some of them were even bilingual, facilitating decipherment of the new language. Besides the Buddhist and Manichaean religious texts, there were also monastery correspondence and accounts, commercial documents, caravan permits, medical and magical texts, and one love poem.

In 1998 the Chinese linguist Ji Xianlin published a translation and analysis of fragments of a Tocharian Maitreyasamiti-Nataka discovered in 1974 in Yanqi.

Tocharian A and B

Tocharian A and B are significantly different, to the point of being mutually unintelligible. A common Proto-Tocharian language must precede the attested languages by several centuries, probably dating to the late 1st millennium BC.

Tocharian A is found only in the eastern part of the Tocharian-speaking area, and all extant texts are of a religious nature. Tocharian B, however, is found throughout the range and in both religious and secular texts. As a result, it has been suggested that Tocharian A was a liturgical language, no longer spoken natively, while Tocharian B was the spoken language of the entire area.

The hypothesized relationship of Tocharian A and B as liturgical and spoken forms, respectively, is sometimes compared with the relationship between Latin and the modern Romance languages, or Classical Chinese and Mandarin. However, in both of these latter cases, the liturgical language is the linguistic ancestor of the spoken language, whereas no such relationship holds between Tocharian A and B. In fact, from a phonological perspective Tocharian B is significantly more conservative than Tocharian A, and serves as the primary source for reconstructing Proto-Tocharian. Only Tocharian B preserves the following Proto-Tocharian features: stress distinctions, final vowels, diphthongs, and o vs. e distinction. In turn, the loss of final vowels in Tocharian A has led to the loss of certain Proto-Tocharian categories still found in Tocharian B, e.g. the vocative case and some of the noun, verb, and adjective declensional classes.

In their declensional and conjugational endings, the two languages innovated in divergent ways, with neither clearly simpler than the other. For example, both languages show significant innovations in the present active indicative endings but in radically different ways, so that only the second-person singular ending is directly cognate between the two languages, and in most cases neither variant is directly cognate with the corresponding Proto-Indo-European (PIE) form. The agglutinative secondary case endings in the two languages likewise stem from different sources, showing parallel development of the secondary case system after the Proto-Tocharian period. Likewise, some of the verb classes show independent origins, e.g. the class II preterite, which uses reduplication in Tocharian A (possibly from the reduplicated aorist) but long PIE ē in Tocharian B (possibly related to the long-vowel perfect found in Latin lēgī, fēcī, etc.).

Tocharian B shows an internal chronological development; three linguistic stages have been detected. The oldest stage is attested only in Kucha. There are also the middle ("classical") and the late stage.

Tocharian C 
A third Tocharian language was first suggested by Thomas Burrow in the 1930s, while discussing 3rd-century documents from Krörän (Loulan) and Niya. The texts were written in Gandhari Prakrit, but contained loanwords of evidently Tocharian origin, such as kilme ("district"), ṣoṣthaṃga ("tax collector"), and ṣilpoga ("document"). This hypothetical language later became generally known as Tocharian C; it has also sometimes been called Kroränian or Krorainic.

In papers published posthumously in 2018, Klaus T. Schmidt, a scholar of Tocharian, presented a decipherment of 10 texts written in the Kharoṣṭhī script. Schmidt claimed that these texts were written in a third Tocharian language he called . He also suggested that the language was closer to Tocharian B than to Tocharian A. In 2019 a group of linguists led by Georges Pinault and Michaël Peyrot convened in Leiden to examine Schmidt's translations against the original texts. They concluded that Schmidt's decipherment was fundamentally flawed, that there was no reason to associate the texts with Krörän, and that the language they recorded was neither Tocharian nor Indic, but Iranian.

Phonology

Phonetically, Tocharian languages are "centum" Indo-European languages, meaning that they merge the palatovelar consonants  of Proto-Indo-European with the plain velars (*k, *g, *gʰ) rather than palatalizing them to affricates or sibilants. Centum languages are mostly found in western and southern Europe (Greek, Italic, Celtic, Germanic). In that sense Tocharian (to some extent like the Greek and the Anatolian languages) seems to have been an isolate in the "satem" (i.e. palatovelar to sibilant) phonetic regions of Indo-European-speaking populations. The discovery of Tocharian contributed to doubts that Proto-Indo-European had originally split into western and eastern branches; today, the centum–satem division is not seen as a real familial division.

Vowels

Tocharian A and Tocharian B have the same set of vowels, but they often do not correspond to each other. For example, the sound a did not occur in Proto-Tocharian.

Diphthongs
Diphthongs occur in Tocharian B only.

Consonants

The following table lists the reconstructed phonemes in Tocharian along with their standard transcription. Because Tocharian is written in an alphabet used originally for Sanskrit and its descendants, the transcription reflects Sanskrit phonology, and may not represent Tocharian phonology accurately. The Tocharian alphabet also has letters representing all of the remaining Sanskrit sounds, but these appear only in Sanskrit loanwords and are not thought to have had distinct pronunciations in Tocharian. There is some uncertainty as to actual pronunciation of some of the letters, particularly those representing palatalized obstruents (see below).

  is transcribed by two different letters in the Tocharian alphabet depending on position. Based on the corresponding letters in Sanskrit, these are transcribed  (word-finally, including before certain clitics) and n (elsewhere), but  represents , not .
 The sound written  is thought to correspond to a alveolo-palatal affricate  in Sanskrit. The Tocharian pronunciation  is suggested by the common occurrence of the cluster śc, but the exact pronunciation cannot be determined with certainty.
 The sound written  seems more likely to have been a palato-alveolar sibilant  (as in English "ship"), because it derives from a palatalized .
 The sound ṅ  occurs only before k, or in some clusters where a k has been deleted between consonants. It is clearly phonemic because sequences nk and ñk also exist (from syncope of a former ä between them).

Morphology

Nouns
Tocharian has completely re-worked the nominal declension system of Proto-Indo-European. The only cases inherited from the proto-language are nominative, genitive, accusative, and (in Tocharian B only) vocative; in Tocharian the old accusative is known as the oblique case. In addition to these primary cases, however, each Tocharian language has six cases formed by the addition of an invariant suffix to the oblique case — although the set of six cases is not the same in each language, and the suffixes are largely non-cognate. For example, the Tocharian word  (Toch B),  (Toch A) "horse" < PIE *eḱwos is declined as follows:

The Tocharian A instrumental case rarely occurs with humans.

When referring to humans, the oblique singular of most adjectives and of some nouns is marked in both varieties by an ending -(a)ṃ, which also appears in the secondary cases. This is thought to stem from the generalization of n-stem adjectives as an indication of determinative semantics, seen most prominently in the weak adjective declension in the Germanic languages (where it cooccurs with definite articles and determiners), but also in Latin and Greek n-stem nouns (especially proper names) formed from adjectives, e.g. Latin Catō (genitive Catōnis) literally "the sly one" < catus "sly", Greek Plátōn literally "the broad-shouldered one" < platús "broad".

Verbs

In contrast, the verbal conjugation system is quite conservative. The majority of Proto-Indo-European verbal classes and categories are represented in some manner in Tocharian, although not necessarily with the same function. Some examples: athematic and thematic present tenses, including null-, -y-, -sḱ-, -s-, -n- and -nH- suffixes as well as n-infixes and various laryngeal-ending stems; o-grade and possibly lengthened-grade perfects (although lacking reduplication or augment); sigmatic, reduplicated, thematic, and possibly lengthened-grade aorists; optatives; imperatives; and possibly PIE subjunctives.

In addition, most PIE sets of endings are found in some form in Tocharian (although with significant innovations), including thematic and athematic endings, primary (non-past) and secondary (past) endings, active and mediopassive endings, and perfect endings. Dual endings are still found, although they are rarely attested and generally restricted to the third person. The mediopassive still reflects the distinction between primary -r and secondary -i, effaced in most Indo-European languages. Both root and suffix ablaut is still well-represented, although again with significant innovations.

Categories
Tocharian verbs are conjugated in the following categories:
Mood: indicative, subjunctive, optative, imperative.
Tense/aspect (in the indicative only): present, preterite, imperfect.
Voice: active, mediopassive, deponent.
Person: 1st, 2nd, 3rd.
Number: singular, dual, plural.
Causation: basic, causative.
Non-finite: active participle, mediopassive participle, present gerundive, subjunctive gerundive.

Classes
A given verb belongs to one of a large number of classes, according to its conjugation. As in Sanskrit, Ancient Greek, and (to a lesser extent) Latin, there are independent sets of classes in the indicative present, subjunctive, perfect, imperative, and to a limited extent optative and imperfect, and there is no general correspondence among the different sets of classes, meaning that each verb must be specified using a number of principal parts.

Present indicative
The most complex system is the present indicative, consisting of 12 classes, 8 thematic and 4 athematic, with distinct sets of thematic and athematic endings. The following classes occur in Tocharian B (some are missing in Tocharian A):
I: Athematic without suffix < PIE root athematic.
II: Thematic without suffix < PIE root thematic.
III: Thematic with PToch suffix *-ë-. Mediopassive only. Apparently reflecting consistent PIE o theme rather than the normal alternating o/e theme.
IV: Thematic with PToch suffix *-ɔ-. Mediopassive only. Same PIE origin as previous class, but diverging within Proto-Tocharian.
V: Athematic with PToch suffix *-ā-, likely from either PIE verbs ending in a syllabic laryngeal or PIE derived verbs in *-eh₂- (but extended to other verbs).
VI: Athematic with PToch suffix *-nā-, from PIE verbs in *-nH-.
VII: Athematic with infixed nasal, from PIE infixed nasal verbs.
VIII: Thematic with suffix -s-, possibly from PIE -sḱ-?
IX: Thematic with suffix -sk- < PIE -sḱ-.
X: Thematic with PToch suffix *-näsk/nāsk- (evidently a combination of classes VI and IX).
XI: Thematic in PToch suffix *-säsk- (evidently a combination of classes VIII and IX).
XII: Thematic with PToch suffix *-(ä)ññ- < either PIE *-n-y- (denominative to n-stem nouns) or PIE *-nH-y- (deverbative from PIE *-nH- verbs).

Palatalization of the final root consonant occurs in the 2nd singular, 3rd singular, 3rd dual and 2nd plural in thematic classes II and VIII-XII as a result of the original PIE thematic vowel e.

Subjunctive
The subjunctive likewise has 12 classes, denoted i through xii. Most are conjugated identically to the corresponding indicative classes; indicative and subjunctive are distinguished by the fact that a verb in a given indicative class will usually belong to a different subjunctive class.

In addition, four subjunctive classes differ from the corresponding indicative classes, two "special subjunctive" classes with differing suffixes and two "varying subjunctive" classes with root ablaut reflecting the PIE perfect.

Special subjunctives:
iv: Thematic with suffix i < PIE -y-, with consistent palatalization of final root consonant. Tocharian B only, rare.
vii: Thematic (not athematic, as in indicative class VII) with suffix ñ < PIE -n- (palatalized by thematic e, with palatalized variant generalized).

Varying subjunctives:
i: Athematic without suffix, with root ablaut reflecting PIE o-grade in active singular, zero-grade elsewhere. Derived from PIE perfect.
v: Identical to class i but with PToch suffix *-ā-, originally reflecting laryngeal-final roots but generalized.

Preterite
The preterite has 6 classes:
I: The most common class, with a suffix ā < PIE Ḥ (i.e. roots ending in a laryngeal, although widely extended to other roots). This class shows root ablaut, with original e-grade (and palatalization of the initial root consonant) in the active singular, contrasting with zero-grade (and no palatalization) elsewhere.
II: This class has reduplication in Tocharian A (possibly reflecting the PIE reduplicated aorist). However, Tocharian B has a vowel reflecting long PIE ē, along with palatalization of the initial root consonant. There is no ablaut in this class.
III: This class has a suffix s in the 3rd singular active and throughout the mediopassive, evidently reflecting the PIE sigmatic aorist. Root ablaut occurs between active and mediopassive. A few verbs have palatalization in the active along with s in the 3rd singular, but no palatalization and no s in the mediopassive, along with no root ablaut (the vowel reflects PToch ë). This suggests that, for these verbs in particular, the active originates in the PIE sigmatic aorist (with s suffix and ē vocalism) while the mediopassive stems from the PIE perfect (with o vocalism).
IV: This class has suffix ṣṣā, with no ablaut. Most verbs in this class are causatives.
V: This class has suffix ñ(ñ)ā, with no ablaut. Only a few verbs belong to this class.
VI: This class, which has only two verbs, is derived from the PIE thematic aorist. As in Greek, this class has different endings from all the others, which partly reflect the PIE secondary endings (as expected for the thematic aorist).

All except preterite class VI have a common set of endings that stem from the PIE perfect endings, although with significant innovations.

Imperative
The imperative likewise shows 6 classes, with a unique set of endings, found only in the second person, and a prefix beginning with p-. This prefix usually reflects Proto-Tocharian *pä- but unexpected connecting vowels occasionally occur, and the prefix combines with vowel-initial and glide-initial roots in unexpected ways. The prefix is often compared with the Slavic perfective prefix po-, although the phonology is difficult to explain.

Classes i through v tend to co-occur with preterite classes I through V, although there are many exceptions. Class vi is not so much a coherent class as an "irregular" class with all verbs not fitting in other categories. The imperative classes tend to share the same suffix as the corresponding preterite (if any), but to have root vocalism that matches the vocalism of a verb's subjunctive. This includes the root ablaut of subjunctive classes i and v, which tend to co-occur with imperative class i.

Optative and imperfect
The optative and imperfect have related formations. The optative is generally built by adding i onto the subjunctive stem. Tocharian B likewise forms the imperfect by adding i onto the present indicative stem, while Tocharian A has 4 separate imperfect formations: usually ā is added to the subjunctive stem, but occasionally to the indicative stem, and sometimes either ā or s is added directly onto the root. The endings differ between the two languages: Tocharian A uses present endings for the optative and preterite endings for the imperfect, while Tocharian B uses the same endings for both, which are a combination of preterite and unique endings (the latter used in the singular active).

Endings
As suggested by the above discussion, there are a large number of sets of endings. The present-tense endings come in both thematic and athematic variants, although they are related, with the thematic endings generally reflecting a theme vowel (PIE e or o) plus the athematic endings. There are different sets for the preterite classes I through V; preterite class VI; the imperative; and in Tocharian B, in the singular active of the optative and imperfect. Furthermore, each set of endings comes with both active and mediopassive forms. The mediopassive forms are quite conservative, directly reflecting the PIE variation between -r in the present and -i in the past. (Most other languages with the mediopassive have generalized one of the two.)

The present-tense endings are almost completely divergent between Tocharian A and B. The following shows the thematic endings, with their origin:

Comparison to other Indo-European languages

In traditional Indo-European studies, no hypothesis of a closer genealogical relationship of the Tocharian languages has been widely accepted by linguists. However, lexicostatistical and glottochronological approaches suggest the Anatolian languages, including Hittite, might be the closest relatives of Tocharian.
As an example, the same Proto-Indo-European root  (but not a common suffixed formation) can be reconstructed to underlie the words for 'wheel': Tocharian A wärkänt, Tokharian B yerkwanto, and Hittite ḫūrkis.

Contact with other languages 
The Tocharian language stood in contact with various surrounding languages, including Iranian, Uralic, Turkic, and Sinitic languages. Tocharian borrowings, and other Indo-European loanwords transmitted through the Tocharians towards Uralic, Turkic and Sinitic speakers, have been confirmed. Influence onto the Tocharian vowel system, which shows certain similarities to Uralic languages is explained through early contact during the Afanasievo culture. Another characteristic of Tocharian is its agglutinative case marking and case functions, as well as the lack of dative case. Tocharian had a high social position within the region, and influenced the Turkic languages, which would later replace Tocharian in the Tarim Basin.

Notable example
Most of the texts known from the Tocharians are religious, but one noted text is a fragment of a love poem in Tocharian B (manuscript B-496, found in Kizil):

See also
Language families and languages
Tocharians
Tocharian and Indo-European Studies (journal)

References

Citations

Sources 

 
 
 
 
 
 
 
 Carling, Gerd (2009). Dictionary and Thesaurus of Tocharian A. Volume 1: a-j. (in collaboration with Georges-Jean Pinault and Werner Winter), Wiesbaden, Harrassowitz Verlag, .
 
 
 
 
 
 
Lévi, Sylvain (1913). "Tokharian Pratimoksa Fragment". The Journal of the Royal Asiatic Society of Great Britain and Ireland, pp. 109–120.
 
Malzahn, Melanie (ed.) (2007). Instrumenta Tocharica. Heidelberg: Carl Winter Universitätsverlag, .
 
 Pinault, Georges-Jean (2008). Chrestomathie tokharienne: Textes et grammaire. Leuven-Paris: Peeters (Collection linguistique publiée par la Société de Linguistique de Paris, no. XCV), .
 
Ringe, Donald A. (1996). On the Chronology of Sound Changes in Tocharian: Volume I: From Proto-Indo-European to Proto-Tocharian. New Haven, CT: American Oriental Society.
 Schmalsteig, William R. (1974). "Tokharian and Baltic." Lituanus. v. 20, no. 3.
 
 Winter, Werner (1998). "Tocharian." In Ramat, Giacalone Anna and Paolo Ramat (eds). The Indo-European languages, 154–168. London: Routledge, .

Further reading

 Bednarczuk, Leszek; Elżbieta Mańczak-Wohlfeld, and Barbara Podolak. “Non-Indo-European Features of the Tocharian Dialects”. In: Words and Dictionaries: A Festschrift for Professor Stanisław Stachowski on the Occasion of His 85th Birthday. Jagiellonian University Press, 2016. pp. 55–68.
 Blažek, Václav; Schwarz, Michal (2017). The early Indo-Europeans in Central Asia and China: Cultural relations as reflected in language. Innsbruck: Innsbrucker Beiträge zur Kulturwissenschaft. .
 Hackstein, Olav. “Collective and Feminine in Tocharian.” In: Multilingualism and History of Knowledge, Vol. 2: Linguistic Developments Along the Silkroad: Archaism and Innovation in Tocharian, edited by OLAV HACKSTEIN and RONALD I. KIM, 12:143–78. Austrian Academy of Sciences Press, 2012. https://doi.org/10.2307/j.ctt3fgk5q.8.
 Lubotsky A. M. (1998). "Tocharian loan words in Old Chinese: Chariots, chariot gear, and town building". In: Mair V.H. (Ed.). The Bronze Age and Early Iron Age Peoples of Eastern Central Asia. Washington D.C.: Institute for the Study of Man. pp. 379–390. http://hdl.handle.net/1887/2683
 Lubotsky A. M. (2003). "Turkic and Chinese loan words in Tocharian". In: Bauer B.L.M., Pinault G.-J. (Eds.). Language in time and space: A Festschrift for Werner Winter on the occasion of his 80th birthday. Berlin/New York: Mouton de Gruyter. pp. 257–269. http://hdl.handle.net/1887/16336
 Meier, Kristin and Peyrot, Michaël. "The Word for ‘Honey’ in Chinese, Tocharian and Sino-Vietnamese." In: Zeitschrift Der Deutschen Morgenländischen Gesellschaft 167, no. 1 (2017): 7–22. doi:10.13173/zeitdeutmorggese.167.1.0007.
 Miliūtė-Chomičenkienė, Aleta. “Baltų-slavų-tocharų leksikos gretybės” [ETYMOLOGICAL PARALLELS IN BALTIC, SLAVIC AND TOCHARIAN IN “NAMES OF ANIMALS AND THEIR BODY PARTS"]. In: Baltistica XXVI (2): 135–143. 1990. DOI: 10.15388/baltistica.26.2.2075 (In Lithuanian)
 Peyrot, Michaël. “On the Formation of the Tocharian Preterite Participle.” Historische Sprachforschung / Historical Linguistics 121 (2008): 69–83. http://www.jstor.org/stable/41637843.
 Peyrot, Michaël. "The deviant typological profile of the Tocharian branch of Indo-European may be due to Uralic substrate influence". In: Indo-European Linguistics 7, 1 (2019): 72-121. doi: https://doi.org/10.1163/22125892-00701007
 PINAULT, GEORGES-JEAN. “TOKH. B ‘KUCAÑÑE’, A ‘KUCIṂ’ ET SKR. ‘TOKHARIKA’” . In: Indo-Iranian Journal 45, no. 4 (2002): 311–45. http://www.jstor.org/stable/24664155.
 Witczak, Krzysztof Tomasz. “TWO TOCHARIAN BORROWINGS OF ORIENTAL ORIGIN”. In: Acta Orientalia Academiae Scientiarum Hungaricae 66, no. 4 (2013): 411–16. http://www.jstor.org/stable/43282527.

External links
 Tocharian alphabet (from Omniglot)
 Thesaurus Indogermanischer Text- und Sprachmaterialien (TITUS):
 Tocharian alphabet
 Conjugation tables for Tocharian A and B
 Tocharian A manuscripts from the Berlin Turfan Collection
 Mark Dickens, "Everything you always wanted to know about Tocharian"
 Tocharian Online by Todd B. Krause and Jonathan Slocum, free online lessons at the Linguistics Research Center at the University of Texas at Austin
 Online dictionary of Tocharian B, based upon D. Q. Adams's A Dictionary of Tocharian B (1999)
 Tocharian B Swadesh list (From Wiktionary)
 Comprehensive Edition of Tocharian Manuscripts, University of Vienna, with images, transcriptions and (in many cases) translations and other information.
  Transcriptions of Tocharian A manuscripts.
 
 glottothèque – Ancient Indo-European Grammars online, an online collection of introductory videos to Ancient Indo-European languages produced by the University of Göttingen

 
Medieval languages
Indo-European languages
Languages of China
Central Asia
Extinct languages of Asia
Languages attested from the 6th century
Languages extinct in the 9th century